This is a list of Danish television related events from 1958.

Events
16 February - Raquel Rastenni is selected to represent Denmark at the 1958 Eurovision Song Contest with her song "Jeg rev et blad ud af min dagbog". She is selected to be the second Danish Eurovision entry during Dansk Melodi Grand Prix held at the Radiohouse in Copenhagen.

Debuts

Television shows

Ending this year

Births
24 September - Benedikte Hansen, actress
13 November - Søs Egelind, actress & comedian

See also
 1958 in Denmark

Deaths